Jean Jonathan Márquez Orellana (born on 6 March 1985), is a Guatemalan professional footballer who plays as a midfielder for Liga Nacional club Mixco.

Career

International goals
Scores and results list Guatemala's goal tally first.

Honours
Jalapa
Liga Nacional de Guatemala: Apertura 2008

Comunicaciones 
Liga Nacional de Guatemala: Apertura 2009, Clausura 2011, Apertura 2011, Clausura 2013, Apertura 2013, Clausura 2014, Apertura 2014, Clausura 2015

Mixco
Primera División: Clausura 2022

References

External links

1985 births
Living people
Guatemalan footballers
Guatemala international footballers
Comunicaciones F.C. players
2015 CONCACAF Gold Cup players
People from Petén Department
Association football midfielders